Michael Jay, born Michael Jay Margules on December 17, 1959, is an American songwriter, record producer, and studio owner. He is best known for his collaborations with Martika. He has also worked with Celine Dion and Kylie Minogue, among others.

Selected production discography
 Luther Ingram – Luther Ingram (1986)
 Five Star – Silk & Steel (1986)
 Fire on Blonde – "Wrong Number" (1987) (single)
 Fire on Blonde – "Bounce Back" (1987) (single)
 Martika – Martika (1988)
 Anna Marie – Anna Marie (1990)
 Peter Allen – Making Every Moment Count (1990)
 Alisha – Bounce Back (1990)
 Kylie Minogue – Rhythm of Love (1990)
 Seiko Matsuda – Seiko (1990)
 Rey – "Love Don't Come in a Minute" (1991) (single)
 Five Star – Shine (1991)
 Keedy – Chase the Clouds (1991)
 Yell! – Let's Go (1991)
 Brenda K. Starr – By Heart (1991)
 Evelyn "Champagne" King – I'll Keep a Light On (1995)
 David Mader – 90 Days of Rain (2005)

References

External links
 

Living people
1959 births
Musicians from Chicago
Record producers from Illinois
Songwriters from Illinois